Bowie Crevasse Field is a large crevasse field at a break in slope on the Minnesota Glacier between the southeast end of the Bastien Range and Anderson Massif in the Ellsworth Mountains of Antarctica. It was named by the University of Minnesota Ellsworth Mountains Party, 1962–63, for Glenn E. Bowie, geophysicist with the party.

References
 

Crevasse fields of Antarctica
Bodies of ice of Ellsworth Land